Ian Fletcher may refer to:

Ian Fletcher (diplomat), Director of GCSB in New Zealand
Ian Fletcher (literary critic) (1920–1988), British scholar
Ian Fletcher (tennis) (born 1948), former tennis player from Australia
Ian Fletcher, the main character in the novel Keeping Faith by Jodi Picoult
Ian Fletcher, the main character in the BBC comedy series Twenty Twelve and its follow-up W1A, played by Hugh Bonneville

See also
Iain Fletcher (born 1966), British television actor
Iain Fletcher (cricketer) (born 1971), English cricketer